Prince August Aleksander Czartoryski (9 November 1697, Warsaw4 April 1782, Warsaw) was a member of the Polish nobility, magnate.

Life 
August became major-general of the Polish Army in 1729, voivode of the Ruthenian Voivodeship in 1731, general starost of Podolia in 1750–1758, and a Knight of Malta. He was starost of Warsaw, Kościerzyna, Lubochnia, Kałusz, Latowicz, Lucyn, Wąwolnica, Kupiski and Pieniań.

He supported Stanisław Leszczyński during the War of the Polish Succession. During the reign of August III, with his brother Michał, Czartoryski was a leader of the "Familia." During the interregnum of 1763–64, he strove for the Polish crown for himself, later for his son Adam Kazimierz. From 1764 to 1766, he was marshal of the General Confederation; from 1764, a commander for the Crown. He was a supporter of political reforms during the Republic, and an opponent of the Radom Confederation.

Awards
 Knight of the White Eagle Order, awarded 23 July 1731
 Knight of the Order of Saint Stanislaus
 Order of Saint Andrzej

Ancestry

External links
 http://www.wilanow-palac.pl/czartoryski_august.html

Secular senators of the Polish–Lithuanian Commonwealth
Austrian military personnel
1697 births
1782 deaths
Nobility from Warsaw
People from Masovian Voivodeship (1526–1795)
Ruthenian nobility of the Polish–Lithuanian Commonwealth
Voivodes of the Ruthenian Voivodeship
Aleksander August
Generals of the Polish–Lithuanian Commonwealth
Recipients of the Order of the White Eagle (Poland)